Practical atheism is the view that one should live their life with disregard towards a god. Practical atheism does not reject or accept claims about God. Practical atheism has an overlap with apatheism and pragmatic atheism. Apatheism sees the god question as irrelevant while practical atheism does not. Since practical atheism doesn't address the god claim one can be both a theist and a practical atheist.

Forms
Philosopher Zofia Zdybicka lists four forms of practical atheism.
Where one is not guided by religious principles
Where one has a lack of interest in matters related to a god or gods
Ignorance of the concept of a god 
Where one excludes a god or gods from intellectual pursuits and practical action at the individual or social level

History
Historically, practical atheism was considered by some people to be associated with moral failure, willful ignorance, and impiety. Those considered practical atheists were said to behave as though God, ethics, and social responsibility did not exist.

According to the French Catholic philosopher Étienne Borne, "Practical atheism is not the denial of the existence of God, but complete godlessness of action; it is a moral evil, implying not the denial of the absolute validity of the moral law but simply rebellion against that law."
In response to Voltaire, French philosopher Denis Diderot wrote: "It is very important not to mistake hemlock for parsley; but not at all so to believe or not in God."

References

Philosophy of religion